Dr. Shrinker was a segment during the first season of the ABC network's The Krofft Supershow in 1976.

Plot
Dr. Shrinker (Jay Robinson) is a mad scientist who creates a shrinking ray that can miniaturize anything. Three teenagers — Brad Fulton (Ted Eccles), B.J. Masterson (Susan Lawrence) and her brother Gordie Masterson (Jeff MacKay) — crash land their airplane on an island. As they make their way to the only house on the island, they meet Dr. Shrinker and his assistant, Hugo (Billy Barty). The remainder of the series was different efforts by the 'Shrinkies' to return to normal size, while Dr. Shrinker and Hugo want to catch the trio so that they will have physical proof that the ray works for whatever world power wants to buy it. Dr. Shrinker also implied that he would give the unnamed buyer the Shrinkies as a free bonus. However, in one episode, Dr. Shrinker's plan was to sell the shrinking ray to the highest bidder, and the second highest bidder would receive the Shrinkies.

Each episode was basically the same. As Dr. Shrinker himself said in one episode..."I chase the Shrinkies. I catch the Shrinkies. The Shrinkies escape. It's a vicious cycle, and it's driving me mad!"

The concept was very likely inspired by the 1940 film Dr. Cyclops in which a scientist working in the South American jungle uses his radiation experiments to shrink a group of fellow scientists to prevent them from discovering his secret work.

Dr. Shrinker lasted only one season on The Krofft Supershow. During the second season, it was dropped (as was the superhero segment Electra Woman and Dyna Girl). One episode, "Slowly I Turn", is available on DVD with the Krofft Box Set. In 2005, Marty Krofft said that he and his brother would be recording commentary for a DVD release of Dr. Shrinker.

Cast
 Jay Robinson as Dr. Shrinker
 Billy Barty as Hugo, Dr. Shrinker's assistant
 Ted Eccles as Brad Fulton
 Susan Lawrence as B.J. Masterson
 Jeff MacKay as Gordie Masterson

Episodes

Notes

External links
 
 

American children's fantasy television series
American children's science fiction television series
Shrinker, Dr.
Shrinker, Dr.
1970s American children's comedy television series
1970s American comic science fiction television series
1976 American television series debuts
1977 American television series endings
Television series about size change
Television series about teenagers
Television series by Sid and Marty Krofft Television Productions
The Krofft Supershow